Miss Scotland is a national beauty pageant in Scotland. Entrants must hold a British passport to enter. The contest, whose title is owned by the Miss World organisation, is organised each year by  Janis Sue Smith Director of The Catwalk Academy 

The winner of the Miss Scotland competition, along with the winners of Miss England, Miss Northern Ireland and Miss Wales, can compete in Miss World. The highest-ranking competitor of the four constituent country entrants is then presented with the title and crown of Miss United Kingdom, and will later compete in Miss International.

History
From 1961 to 1990, the winners of Miss Scotland went on to compete at the Miss Universe pageant, usually held in the summer. They would then compete, along with the winners of Miss England, Miss Wales and Miss Northern Ireland, and other top contenders from the regional competitions, in the Miss United Kingdom pageant, with the winner of Miss UK going on to compete at the Miss World pageant in November.

During the 1990s there was no Miss Scotland at Miss Universe.

In 1999, after Scottish devolution, Miss Scotland was allowed to enter the Miss World pageant. The first Miss Scotland to compete in Miss World was Stephanie Norrie; she competed alongside Miss Wales, who was Clare Daniels, and Nicola Willoughby, who won the last Miss United Kingdom pageant that year. Miss England and Miss Northern Ireland first competed at Miss World in 2000. Since then, the highest ranking of the four UK contestants has won the Miss United Kingdom title. In recent years the Miss UK titleholder has also been offered the chance to participate at the following year's Miss International pageant, as Miss UK.

In the 21st century, the Miss Scotland contest has enjoyed a high profile, with sponsorship from the Scottish Sun newspaper. Miss Scotland has also been the most successful of the four UK nations at Miss World. Since 2000, the Miss UK title has been won by Miss Scotland nine times. England has 4 wins, Wales 3 and Northern Ireland 2 (2016 unknown).

Titleholders
colorkey

From 1961 - 1990, the winner of Miss Scotland represented her country at the Miss Universe pageant.

Miss Scotland 1997-present
Since 1999, the winner of Miss Scotland has represented her country at the Miss World pageant.

See also
 Miss England
 Miss Northern Ireland
 Miss United Kingdom
 Miss Wales

References

External links
 https://www.theofficialmissscotland.com/

Recurring events established in 2000
2000 in Scotland
Scotland
Scotland
Competitions in Scotland
Beauty pageants in Scotland
Annual events in Scotland
Scottish awards
Scotland

fr:Miss Écosse